Paul Revere (December 21, 1734 O.S. (January 1, 1735 N.S.)May 10, 1818) was an American silversmith, engraver, early industrialist, Sons of Liberty member, and Patriot. He is best known for his midnight ride to alert the colonial militia in April 1775 to the approach of British forces before the battles of Lexington and Concord, as dramatized in Henry Wadsworth Longfellow's 1861 poem, "Paul Revere's Ride".

At age 41, Revere was a prosperous, established and prominent Boston silversmith. He had helped organize an intelligence and alarm system to keep watch on the British military. Revere later served as a Massachusetts militia officer, though his service ended after the Penobscot Expedition, one of the most disastrous campaigns of the American Revolutionary War, for which he was absolved of blame.

Following the war, Revere returned to his silversmith trade. He used the profits from his expanding business to finance his work in iron casting, bronze bell and cannon casting, and the forging of copper bolts and spikes. In 1800, he became the first American to successfully roll copper into sheets for use as sheathing on naval vessels.

Early life and education
Revere was born in the North End of Boston on December 21, 1734, according to the Old Style calendar then in use, or January 1, 1735, in the modern calendar. His father, Apollos Rivoire, a French Huguenot who came to Boston at the age of 13, was apprenticed to the silversmith John Coney. By the time he married Deborah Hitchborn, a member of a long-standing Boston family that owned a small shipping wharf, in 1729, Rivoire had anglicized his name to Paul Revere. Their son, Paul Revere, was the third of 12 children and eventually the eldest surviving son. Revere grew up in the environment of the extended Hitchborn family, and never learned his father's native language. At 13 he left school and became an apprentice to his father. The silversmith trade afforded him connections with a cross-section of Boston society, which would serve him well when he became active in the American Revolution. As for religion, although his father attended Puritan services, Revere was drawn to the Church of England. In 1750, aged 15, Revere was part of the first group of change ringers to ring the new bells (cast in 1744) at Christ Church, in the north of Boston (the Old North Church). Revere eventually began attending the services of the political and provocative Jonathan Mayhew at the West Church. His father did not approve, and as a result father and son came to blows on one occasion. Revere relented and returned to his father's church, although he did become friends with Mayhew, and returned to the West Church in the late 1760s.

Revere's father died in 1754, when Paul was legally too young to officially be the master of the family silver shop. In February 1756, during the French and Indian War (the North American theater of the Seven Years' War), he enlisted in the provincial army. Possibly he made this decision because of the weak economy, since army service promised consistent pay. Commissioned a second lieutenant in a provincial artillery regiment, he spent the summer at Fort William Henry at the southern end of Lake George in New York as part of an abortive plan for the capture of Fort St. Frédéric. He did not stay long in the army, but returned to Boston and assumed control of the silver shop in his own name. On August 4, 1757, he married Sarah Orne (1736–1773); their first child was born eight months later. He and Sarah had eight children, but two died young, and only one, Mary, survived her father.

1765–1774: the gathering storm of revolution

Revere's business began to suffer when the British economy entered a recession in the years following the Seven Years' War, and declined further when the Stamp Act of 1765 resulted in a further downturn in the Massachusetts economy. Business was so poor that an attempt was made to seize his property in late 1765. To help make ends meet he even took up dentistry, a skill set he was taught by a practicing surgeon who lodged at a friend's house. One client was Joseph Warren, a local physician and political opposition leader with whom Revere formed a close friendship. Revere and Warren, in addition to having common political views, were also both active in the same local Masonic lodges.

Although Revere was not one of the "Loyal Nine"—organizers of the earliest protests against the Stamp Act—he was well connected with its members, who were laborers and artisans. Revere did not participate in some of the more raucous protests, such as the attack on the home of Lieutenant Governor Thomas Hutchinson. In 1765, a group of militants who would become known as the Sons of Liberty formed, of which Revere was a member. From 1765 on, in support of the dissident cause, he produced engravings and other artifacts with political themes. Among these engravings are a depiction of the arrival of British troops in 1768 (which he termed "an insolent parade") and a famous depiction of the March 1770 Boston Massacre (see illustration). Although the latter was engraved by Revere and he included the inscription, "Engraved, Printed, & Sold by Paul Revere Boston", it was modeled on a drawing by Henry Pelham, and Revere's engraving of the drawing was colored by a third man and printed by a fourth. Revere also produced a bowl commemorating the Massachusetts assembly's refusal to retract the Massachusetts Circular Letter. (This letter, adopted in response to the 1767 Townshend Acts, called for united colonial action against the acts. King George III had issued a demand for its retraction.)

In 1770 Revere purchased a house, now a museum on North Square in Boston's North End. The house provided space for his growing family while he continued to maintain his shop at nearby Clark's Wharf. Sarah died in 1773, and on October 10 of that year, Revere married Rachel Walker (1745–1813). They had eight children, three of whom died young.

In November 1773 the merchant ship Dartmouth arrived in Boston harbor carrying the first shipment of tea made under the terms of the Tea Act. This act authorized the British East India Company to ship tea (of which it had huge surpluses due to colonial boycotts organized in response to the Townshend Acts) directly to the colonies, bypassing colonial merchants. Passage of the act prompted calls for renewed protests against the tea shipments, on which Townshend duties were still levied. Revere and Warren, as members of the informal North End Caucus, organized a watch over the Dartmouth to prevent the unloading of the tea. Revere took his turns on guard duty, and was one of the ringleaders in the Boston Tea Party of December 16, when colonists dumped tea from the Dartmouth and two other ships into the harbor.

From December 1773 to November 1775, Revere served as a courier for the Boston Committee of Public Safety, traveling to New York and Philadelphia to report on the political unrest in Boston. Research has documented 18 such rides. Notice of some of them was published in Massachusetts newspapers, and British authorities received further intelligence of them from Loyalist Americans. In 1774, his cousin John on the island of Guernsey wrote to Paul that John had seen reports of Paul's role as an "express" (courier) in London newspapers.

In 1774, the military governor of Massachusetts, General Thomas Gage, dissolved the provincial assembly on orders from Great Britain. Governor Gage also closed the port of Boston and all over the city forced private citizens to quarter (provide lodging for) soldiers in their homes.

During this time, Revere and a group of 30 "mechanics" began meeting in secret at his favorite haunt, the Green Dragon, to coordinate the gathering and dissemination of intelligence by "watching the Movements of British Soldiers". Around this time Revere regularly contributed politically charged engravings to the recently founded Patriot monthly, Royal American Magazine.

He rode to Portsmouth, New Hampshire, in December 1774 upon rumors of an impending landing of British troops there, a journey known in history as the Portsmouth Alarm. Although the rumors were false, his ride sparked a rebel success by provoking locals to raid Fort William and Mary, defended by just six soldiers, for its gunpowder supply.

"Midnight Ride"

War years
Because Boston was besieged after the battles of Lexington and Concord, Revere could not return to the city, which was now firmly in British hands. He boarded in Watertown, where he was eventually joined by Rachel and most of his children (Paul Jr., then 15, remained in Boston to mind the family properties). After he was denied a commission in the Continental Army, he tried to find other ways to be useful to the rebel cause. He was retained by the provincial congress as a courier, and he printed local currency which the congress used to pay the troops around Boston.

Since there was a desperate shortage of gunpowder, the provincial congress decided in November 1775 to send him to Philadelphia to study the working of the only powder mill in the colonies, in the hopes that he might be able to build a second one in Massachusetts. Revere called on the mill's owner, Oswald Eve, armed with a letter from Continental Congressmen Robert Morris and John Dickinson asking Eve to "Chearfully & from Public Spirited Motives give Mr. Revere such information as will inable him to Conduct the business on his return home." Eve showed Revere around the mill, but refused to give him detailed drawings unless he was first paid a substantial bribe. Despite this chilly reception, Revere was able to discern useful information from the visit. He also acquired, through the work of Samuel Adams, plans for another powder mill. This information enabled Revere to set up a powder mill at Stoughton (present-day Canton). The mill produced tons of gunpowder for the Patriot cause.

Revere's friend and compatriot Joseph Warren was killed in the Battle of Bunker Hill on June 17, 1775. Because soldiers killed in battle were often buried in mass graves without ceremony, Warren's grave was unmarked. On March 21, 1776, several days after the British army left Boston, Revere, Warren's brothers, and a few friends went to the battlefield and found a grave containing two bodies. After being buried for nine months, Warren's face was unrecognizable, but Revere was able to identify Warren's body because he had placed a false tooth in Warren's mouth, and recognized the wire he had used for fastening it. Warren was given a proper funeral and reburied in a marked grave.

Militia service
Upon returning to Boston in 1776, Revere was commissioned a major of infantry in the Massachusetts militia in that April, and transferred to the artillery a month later. In November he was promoted to lieutenant colonel, and was stationed at Castle William, defending Boston harbor. He was generally second or third in the chain of command, and on several occasions he was given command of the fort. He applied his engineering skills to maintaining the fort's armaments, even designing and building a caliper to accurately measure cannonballs and cannon bore holes. The service at Castle William was relatively isolated, and personality friction prompted some men to file complaints against Revere. The boredom was alleviated in late August 1777 when Revere was sent with a troop of soldiers to escort prisoners taken in the Battle of Bennington to Boston, where they were confined on board prison ships, and again in September when he was briefly deployed to Rhode Island.

In August 1778 Revere's regiment served in a combined Franco-American expedition whose objective was to capture the British base at Newport, Rhode Island. His regiment was responsible for erecting and maintaining artillery batteries on Aquidneck Island. The attempt was abandoned by the French when their fleet was scattered in a storm, and Revere's regiment returned to Boston before the British sortied from Newport to force the Battle of Rhode Island.

Penobscot disaster

The British in June 1779 established a new base on Penobscot Bay in present-day Maine (which was then part of Massachusetts). Massachusetts authorities called out the militia, pressed into service available shipping, and organized a major expedition to dislodge the British. The expedition was a complete fiasco: its land and naval commanders squabbled over control of the expedition, and could not agree on strategy or tactics. The arrival of British reinforcements led to the destruction of the entire Massachusetts fleet. Revere commanded the artillery units for the expedition, and was responsible for organizing the artillery train. He participated in the taking of Bank's Island, from which artillery batteries could reach the British ships anchored before Fort George. He next oversaw the transport of the guns from Bank's Island to a new position on the heights of the Bagaduce Peninsula that commanded the fort. Although Revere was in favor of storming the fort, Brigadier General Solomon Lovell opted for a siege instead. After further disagreements on how to proceed between Lovell and fleet commander Dudley Saltonstall, Lovell decided to return to the transports on August 12, a decision supported by Revere.

Late the next day British sails were spotted. A mad scramble ensued, and on the 14th the fleet was in retreat heading up the Penobscot River. Revere and his men were put ashore with their stores, and their transports destroyed. At one point Brigadier General Peleg Wadsworth ordered Revere to send his barge in an attempt to recover a ship drifting toward the enemy position. Revere at first resisted, but eventually complied, and Wadsworth told him to expect formal charges over the affair. The incident separated Revere from his men. Moving overland, he eventually managed to regroup most of his troops, and returned to Boston on August 26. A variety of charges were made against Revere, some of which were exaggerated assignments of blame made by enemies he had made in his command at Castle William. The initial hearings on the matter in September 1779 were inconclusive, but he was asked to resign his post. He repeatedly sought a full court-martial to clear his name, but it was not until February 1782 that a court martial heard the issue, exonerating him.

Business and social connections

During the Revolutionary War, Revere continued his efforts to move upwards in society into the gentry. After his failed efforts to become a military officer he attempted to become a merchant, but was hindered by a number of factors: while he was a fairly well-off member of the artisan class, he did not have the resources to afford the goods he would have sold as a merchant, nor were lenders in England willing to lend him the required startup capital. Other American merchants of the time were able to continue their business with colleagues in England. However, Revere's inexperience as a merchant meant that he had not yet established such relationships and was not able to communicate as effectively on unfamiliar matters. Another factor preventing Revere's success as a merchant was the economic climate of the time period after the war known as the Confederation Period; while the colonies had seen a time of economic growth before the war, the colonies experienced a severe post-war depression, constraining the overall success of his business.

While Revere struggled as a merchant, his success as a silversmith enabled him to pursue and leverage more advanced technological developments for the purposes of mass production. For example, rolling mills greatly improved the productivity of his silver shop and enabled his business to move further away from manufacturing high-end customized products in order to focus instead on the production of a more standardized set of goods. In the 18th century, the standard of living continuously improved in America, as genteel goods became increasingly available to the masses. Revere responded particularly well to this trend because his business was not solely manufacturing custom, high end purchases. Smaller products like teaspoons and buckles accounted for the majority of his work, allowing him to build a broad customer base.

Revere's increased efficiency left financial and human resources available for the exploration of other products, which was essential to overcoming the fluctuating post-war economic climate. In addition to increasing production, the flatting mill enabled Revere to move towards a more managerial position.

Later years: entrepreneurship, manufacturing, and politics

After the war, Revere became interested in metal work beyond gold and silver. By 1788 he had invested some of the profits from his growing silverworking trade to construct a large furnace, which would allow him to work with larger quantities of metals at higher temperatures. He soon opened an iron foundry in Boston's North End that produced utilitarian cast iron items such as stove backs, fireplace tools, and sash-window weights, marketed to a broad segment of Boston's population.  Many of Revere's business practices changed when he expanded his practice into ironworking, because he transitioned from just being an artisan to also being an entrepreneur and a manager. In order to make this transition successfully, Revere had to invest substantial quantities of capital and time in his foundry.

Technological practices

The quasi-industrialization of his practice set Revere apart from his competition. "Revere's rapid foundry success resulted from fortuitous timing, innate technical aptitude, thorough research, and the casting experience he gained from silverworking." This technical proficiency allowed Revere to optimize his work and adapt to a new technological and entrepreneurial model. Revere's location also benefited his endeavors. Revere was entering the field of iron casting in a time when New England cities were becoming centers of industry. The nature of technological advancement was such that many skilled entrepreneurs in a number of fields worked together, in what is known by Nathan Rosenberg as technological convergence, by which a number of companies work together on challenges in order to spur advances. By accessing the knowledge of other nearby metal workers, Revere was able to successfully explore and master new technologies throughout his career.

Labor practices

One of the biggest changes for Revere in his new business was organization of labor. In his earlier days, Revere primarily utilized the apprenticeship model standard for artisan shops at this time, but as his business expanded he hired employees (wage laborers) to work for his foundry. Many manufacturers of the era found this transition from master to employer difficult because many employees at the onset of the Industrial Revolution identified themselves as skilled workers, and thus wanted to be treated with the respect and autonomy accorded to artisans. An artisan himself, Revere managed to avoid many of these labor conflicts by adopting a system of employment that still held trappings of the craft system in the form of worker freedoms such as work hour flexibility, wages in line with skill levels, and liquor on the job.

Manufacturing: church bells, cannon, and copper products

After mastering the iron casting process and realizing substantial profits from this new product line, Revere identified a burgeoning market for church bells in the religious revival known as the Second Great Awakening that followed the war. Beginning in 1792 he became one of America's best-known bell casters, working with sons Paul Jr. and Joseph Warren Revere in the firm Paul Revere & Sons. This firm cast the first bell made in Boston and ultimately produced hundreds of bells, a number of which remain in operation.

In 1794, Revere decided to take the next step in the evolution of his business, expanding his bronze casting work by learning to cast cannon for the federal government, state governments, and private clients. Although the government often had trouble paying him on time, its large orders inspired him to deepen his contracting and seek additional product lines of interest to the military.

By 1795, a growing percentage of his foundry's business came from a new product, copper bolts, spikes, and other fittings that he sold to merchants and the Boston naval yard for ship construction. In 1801, Revere became a pioneer in the production of rolled copper, opening North America's first copper mill south of Boston in Canton. Copper from the Revere Copper Company was used to cover the original wooden dome of the Massachusetts State House in 1802. His copper and brass works eventually grew, through sale and corporate merger, into a large corporation, Revere Copper and Brass, Inc.

Steps towards standardized production
During his earlier days as an artisan, especially when working with silver products, Revere produced "bespoke" or customized goods. As he shifted to ironworking, he found the need to produce more standardized products, because this made production cheaper. To achieve the beginnings of standardization, Revere used identical molds for casting, especially in the fabrication of mass-produced items such as stoves, ovens, frames, and chimney backs. However, Revere did not totally embrace uniform production. For example, his bells and cannons were all unique products: these large objects required extensive fine-tuning and customization, and the small number of bells and cannon minimized the potential benefits of standardizing them. In addition, even the products that he made in large quantities could not be truly standardized due to technological and skill limitations. His products were rarely (if ever) identical, but his processes were well systematized. "He came to realize that the foundry oven melded the characteristics of tools and machines: it required skilled labor and could be used in a flexible manner to produce different products, but an expert could produce consistent output by following a standard set of production practices."

Freemasonry

Revere was a Scottish Freemason. He was a member of Lodge St Andrews, No.81, (Boston, Massachusetts). The Lodge continues to meet in Boston with the number 4 under and the jurisdiction of the Grand Lodge of Massachusetts. The date he joined the Lodge is not known but was sometime after the inauguration of the Lodge on St Andrew's Day, November 30, 1756, and May 15, 1769, when he is recorded in the Grand Lodge of Scotland membership register as the Lodge Secretary. Joseph Warren and William Palfrey are also recorded, on the same page, as members of the Lodge and being Master and Senior Warden respectively. (see image)

He subsequently became the Grand Master of the Freemasons of Massachusetts when a box containing an assemblage of commemorative items was deposited under the cornerstone of the Massachusetts State House on July 4, 1795, by Governor Samuel Adams, assisted by Grand Master Revere and Deputy Grand Master, Colonel William Scollay.

Politics and final years

Revere remained politically active throughout his life. His business plans in the late 1780s were often stymied by a shortage of adequate money in circulation. Alexander Hamilton's national policies regarding banks and industrialization exactly matched his dreams, and he became an ardent Federalist committed to building a robust economy and a powerful nation. Of particular interest to Revere was the question of protective tariffs; he and his son sent a petition to Congress in 1808 asking for protection for his sheet copper business. He continued to participate in local discussions of political issues even after his retirement in 1811, and in 1814 circulated a petition offering the government the services of Boston's artisans in protecting Boston during the War of 1812. Revere died on May 10, 1818, at the age of 83, at his home on Charter Street in Boston. He is buried in the Granary Burying Ground on Tremont Street.

Legacy

After Revere's death, the family business was taken over by his oldest surviving son, Joseph Warren Revere. The copper works founded in 1801 continues today as the Revere Copper Company, with manufacturing divisions in Rome, New York, and New Bedford, Massachusetts.

Revere's original silverware, engravings, and other works are highly regarded today, and can be found on display in museums including the Museum of Fine Arts, Boston and the Metropolitan Museum of Art. The Revere Bell, presented in 1843 to the Church of St. Andrew in Singapore by his daughter, Mrs. Maria Revere Balestier, wife of American consul Joseph Balestier, is now displayed in the National Museum of Singapore. This is the only bell cast by the Revere foundry that is outside the United States. For a time, it was displayed behind velvet ropes in the foyer of the United States Embassy in Singapore.

The communities of Revere, Massachusetts, and Revere, Minnesota, bear his name, as do Revere Beach in Revere, Massachusetts; Revere Avenue in The Bronx, New York City; Paul Revere Road in Arlington, Massachusetts; and Paul Revere Apartments in Seattle.

A 25-cent 1958 U.S. postage stamp in the Liberty Series honors Paul Revere, featuring the portrait by Gilbert Stuart. He also appears on the $5,000 Series EE U.S. Savings Bond.
Ryan Reynolds released a Mint Mobile commercial that features Avery Revere, a direct descent of Paul Revere.

Paul Revere Mall is a corridor located in Boston's North End behind Old North Church. It features the Equestrian statue of Paul Revere by Cyrus Edwin Dallin.

In popular culture 
In episode 8 of the 2nd season of the US TV show The West Wing (1999–2006), Paul Revere is named as the manufacturer of president Bartlet's knife-set he presents to Charlie, his personal aide.

Revere appears in the 2012 video game Assassin's Creed III and is portrayed by Bruce Dinsmore. He is fictitiously depicted riding alongside the game's protagonist, Ratonhnaké:ton, to alert the colonial militias.

Michael Raymond-James portrayed Revere on the 2015 History miniseries Sons of Liberty.

Descendants
Joseph Warren Revere, son
Maria Revere Balestier, daughter
Joseph Warren Revere, grandson; artist, Navy officer, and Union Army general
Paul Revere, great-grandson; Morristown lawyer
Paul Revere Jr. (3rd great-grandson)
Paul Revere III (4th great-grandson)
Pauline Revere Thayer, daughter of Paul Revere III
Avery Revere (4th great-granddaughter)

See also
 Israel Bissell, who rode to Philadelphia with news of the battles of Lexington and Concord
 Sybil Ludington, who is said to have performed a similar ride in New York
 Jack Jouett, rode to warn Thomas Jefferson and the Virginia legislature of a British raid
 Revere Bells, one of Revere's highest-profile products
 Revere Copper Company, the business founded by Paul Revere and later managed by his son and grandsons
 Johnny Tremain, 1943 children's novel by Esther Forbes set in Boston prior to and during the outbreak of the Revolution

References

Notes

Citations

Bibliography

 
 
 
 
 
 
  This work is extensively footnoted, and contains a voluminous list of primary resources concerning all aspects of the Revere's ride and the battles at Lexington and Concord.
 
 
  (Volume 2)

External links

 
 Paul Revere Heritage Project
 The Paul Revere House
  An interactive map showing the routes taken by Revere, Dawes, and Prescott
 Original copper engravings and other documents in collections of the Massachusetts State Archives
 Revere Rolling Mill – about the endangered original Revere copper works site in Canton, MA
 Booknotes interview with David Hackett Fischer on Paul Revere's Ride, July 17, 1994.
 
 

 
1734 births
1818 deaths
18th-century American businesspeople
19th-century American businesspeople
American engravers
American Freemasons
Paul
American military personnel of the Seven Years' War
Huguenot participants in the American Revolution
American silversmiths
Burials at Granary Burying Ground
Foundrymen
American ironmasters
Massachusetts Federalists
Massachusetts militiamen in the American Revolution
Patriots in the American Revolution
Businesspeople from Boston
People from North End, Boston
American spies during the American Revolution
American people of French descent